George A. "Duo" Dickinson, Jr. (born August 21, 1955) is an American architect. Over a period of 30 years, he has built over 500 projects in over 10 states.  Based in Madison, Connecticut, he maintains an office of 10 staff members.

Life and career
Dickinson graduated from Cornell in 1977 with a bachelor's degree in Architecture and opened his own architectural practice in 1987. He is licensed in Connecticut, New York, New Jersey, Massachusetts, Texas, Florida, Arizona, Oklahoma, Minnesota and Tennessee.

His work has received more than 30 awards, including the Architectural Record Record House, the Metropolitan Home Met Home Award, and the Connecticut and New York American Institute of Architects design awards. He is the first non-member award-winner of the Society of America Registered Architects' Special Service Award, and is the co-Founder of The Congress of Residential Architecture (CORA), the first national organization of residential designers, which has grown to over 20 chapters and 1,000 members in seven years. Dickinson serves as the Knowledge Exchange Director for the Building Beauty American Advisory Board. In 2017, he was awarded the honor of Fellowship in AIA.

Publications
Dickinson's design work has appeared in over 70 publications including The New York Times, Architectural Record and House Beautiful. He has written six books, including Small Houses for the Next Century and Expressive Details for McGraw-Hill and The House You Build, published by Taunton Press and as a paperback entitled House On A Budget. His book, Staying Put, received positive reviews in The Washington Post and The New York Times, among other publications. In the Fall of 2017, his latest book, A Home Called New England, co-written with Steven Culpepper was published.

Dickinson is a contributing writer for Mockingbird, Common Edge, and Hearst Publications. He is a contributing writer on home design for Money Magazine, the architecture and urban design critic for the New Haven Register and contributing writer in home design for New Haven magazine and the Hartford Courant. Dickinson has written articles for more than a dozen national publications including Residential Architect, Home and Fine Homebuilding and was a contributing writer for the "By Design" column for This Old House magazine.'Books
1985: Adding On, McGraw Hill 
1986: The Small House, McGraw Hill 
1990: Common Walls/Private Homes, McGraw Hill 
1994: Small Houses for the Next Century. McGraw Hill 
1996: Expressive Details: Materials, Selection, Use. McGraw Hill 
2004: The House You Build.Taunton Press 
2007: House on a Budget. Taunton Press 
2011: Staying Put: Remodel Your House to Get the Home You Want. Taunton Press 
2017: A Home Called New England Global Pequot Press 

Academia
Dickinson has taught at the University of Hartford, Yale College, Roger Williams University and at the Harvard Graduate School of Design Summer Program. Additionally he has lectured at dozens of universities, AIA associations, and at national conventions and gatherings.

Media
Dickinson was the co-host of the CNN/Money Magazine web series Home Work.  He has co-hosted with Bruce Barber on a regional radio program, The Real Life Survival Guide, which began airing in 2011. He has appeared on a variety of national media platforms, including Heritage Radio Network's Burning Down the House, CNN's Open House,  NPR's Studio 360, and Fox's Weekend Marketplace.  He hosts a monthly radio show, Home Page, on WPKN.

References

External links

Official website
Staying Put
"An Architect Who Puts Work Before Worship", The New York Times''
Grace in Built Form interview

1955 births
Living people
21st-century American architects
People from Madison, Connecticut
Cornell University College of Architecture, Art, and Planning alumni
New Classical architects
20th-century American architects